VJ Andy, also known as Andy Kumar, is a British television personality based in India. He worked as Video Jockey for Channel V and has hosted several television programs including Dare 2 Date a dating reality show. He was a contestant in the seventh season of Bigg Boss, finishing fifth.

Early life 
Andy was born Anand Vijay Kumar to a Punjabi Hindu family in Slough, Berkshire, United Kingdom. He lives and works in Mumbai, India.

Career
VJ An Beauty and the Geek and hosted What's With Indian Women on Fox Traveller India with comedian Sanjay Rajoura. In September 2013, he was a contestant on the Indian reality TV show Bigg Boss 7. In 2014 he was seen as a contestant on Jhalak Dikhhla Jaa 7. In October 2015, Andy was seen in the reality show I Can Do That.

Personal life
Kumar has been reported in his country to be a member of the LGBT community.

Television

Web

Filmography

References

Living people
1980 births
People from Slough
British VJs (media personalities)
British  television presenters
Punjabi people
British people of Indian descent
British LGBT entertainers
British expatriates in India
English gay actors
Bigg Boss (Hindi TV series) contestants
20th-century English LGBT people
21st-century English LGBT people